Kowalewski (feminine Kowalewska, plural: Kowalewscy) is a Polish surname. It may refer to:
 (1879–1940), Polish brigade general
Aleksander Kowalewski, Polish spelling of Alexander Kovalevsky (1840-1901), Russian embryologist
 Gerhard Kowalewski (1876–1950), German mathematician
 Günter Kowalewski (born 1943), German wrestler
 Jakub Kowalewski (born 1994), Polish luger
 Jan Kowalewski (1892–1965), Polish cryptologist
 Jerzy Kowalewski (born 1944), Polish diver
 Joe Kowalewski (born 1982), American football player
 Józef Kowalewski (1801–1878), Polish orientalist
 Krzysztof Kowalewski (born 1937), Polish actor
 Marlena Kowalewska (born 1992), Polish volleyball player
 Wojciech Kowalewski (born 1977), Polish footballer

See also
 
 Kowalski, a Polish surname 
 Kovalevsky, a Russian surname

Polish-language surnames